Sollefteå Municipality is a Swedish municipality in Västernorrland County. Its seat is located in Sollefteå.

The former City of Sollefteå (instituted in 1917) was amalgamated with the surrounding entities in 1974 to form the present municipality. It consists of fifteen original (1863) units.

Historically, the name is found as early as the 13th century in the form of the Latin De Solatum, which would translate to "The Sunny Place" (or so). A market place was situated here in 1602 on Royal permission.  The city's coat of arms depicts a Black Grouse.

Geography
Geographically, the landscape is dominated by woods, and by the Ångerman River and its tributaries Faxälven and Fjällsjöälven, which cross through the municipality.

Localities 
 Forsmo
 Junsele
 Långsele
 Näsåker
 Ramsele
 Sollefteå (the seat)
 Österforse

International relations

Twin towns — Sister cities 

Sollefteå is twinned with:
 Põltsamaa, Estonia
 Nykarleby, Finland
 Esashi, Japan
 Steinkjer, Norway
 Rudniki, Poland
 Madison, Mississippi, U.S.

References

External links 

 Sollefteå - Official site

 
Municipalities of Västernorrland County